Naranag or (Nara Nag) is a tourist village and ancient Hindu pilgrimage site, near Ganderbal town in the Ganderbal district of the Kashmir Valley in Jammu and Kashmir, India. Well known for its ancient but pillaged temple ruins complex, it is located around 8 km from Kangan, 6 km upstream from the Sind River. Noted for its scenic meadows, lakes and mountains, it is a base camp for trekking to the Mount Haramukh  and Gangabal Lake. The village lies at the left bank of the Wangath river, which is a tributary of the Sind River. Tourism hut at Naranag for any information and assistance tourism officials are available and hut is also provide for accommodation.

Tourism 

The Naranag valley is noted for its scenic meadows. The village is a base camp for trekkers to the Mount Haramukh, the Gangabal Lake and Satsar (the seven lakes). It is also a base for the trekkers to Gadsar Lake, the Vishansar Lake and the Krishansar Lake, though it takes 5 to 7 days of trekking.

There are also many other peaks and alpine meadows around the Naranag Valley. In the winters, Naranag receives heavy snowfall, during which skiing is practiced.

Naranag Temple 
The Naranag temple is the main attraction for the tourists. It is one of the important archaeological sites of the country. The site consists of a cluster of temples facing each other at a distance of about 200 meters. Historians say that the temple is dedicated to Shiva and was built by Lalitaditya Muktapida, of the Kayastha Naga Karkota Dynasty in the 8th century AD. It is believed that the king Awantivarman paid a visit and donated a pedestal for bathing at Bhuteshwar ("Bhutsher").

It is also believed to be dedicated to the ancient Nagas. Hence, the name "Naranag". It was built by the Naga Karkotas, who are said to be Hindu Kashmiri Kayasthas of the Naga sect, known for their reverence of serpents. They used to stay here and do their sadhanas.

Its architecture reveals the art of the 8th century. The government has only constructed walls to protect it from encroachments and nothing else has been done. It is now left in ruins of which only faint traces have survived. This temple has the typical Aryan structure as was present in Aryan Kashmir.

See also
 Wangath Temple complex

References 

Villages in Ganderbal district